The Great Trial Stakes was an American Thoroughbred horse race held annually at Sheepshead Bay Race Track in Sheepshead Bay, Brooklyn, New York from 1891 through 1910 and for 1913 at Belmont Park in Elmont, New York. Raced on dirt, it was run at a distance of 5¾ furlongs from 1891 through 1900 and then at 6 furlongs. Run in late June or early July, for most of its years at Sheepshead Bay the Great Trial Stakes was the most valuable race for two-year-olds during the track's summer meet.

Historical notes
The Great Trial Stakes attracted the top two-year-olds including ten who would earn American Champion Two-Year-Old honors. Domino (1893), Commando (1900) and Colin (1907) won the race and would go on to be named that year's American Horse of the Year. It is such a rare feat for a two-year-old to earn Horse of the Year honors that from 1908 through 2018 it has been accomplished only four times:
 Native Dancer (1952)
 Moccasin (1965)
 Secretariat (1972)
 Favorite Trick (1997)

A July 1, 1908 Daily Racing Form article reported on the dominance of John Madden in this event who won this race seven times as the trainer and breeder plus he was the owner of five of those winners as well as a minority partner of 1903 winner Pulsus.

The 1911–1912 statewide shutdown of horse racing
On June 11, 1908, the Republican-controlled New York Legislature under Governor Charles Evans Hughes passed the Hart–Agnew anti-betting legislation. The owners of Sheepshead Bay Race Track, and other racing facilities in New York State, struggled to stay in business without income from betting. Racetrack operators had no choice but to drastically reduce the purse money being paid out, which resulted in the Great Trial Stakes offering a purse in 1909 that was less than one-tenth of what it had been a year earlier. These small purses made horse racing unprofitable and impossible for even the most successful horse owners to continue in business. As such, for the 1910 racing season, management of the Sheepshead Bay facility dropped some of its minor stakes races and used the purse money to bolster its most important events. Even with additional funding, the Great Trial Stakes of 1910 was little more than one-third of what it had been in 1908.

In spite of strong opposition by prominent owners such as August Belmont, Jr. and Harry Payne Whitney, reform legislators were not happy when they learned that betting was still going on at racetracks between individuals, and they had further restrictive legislation passed by the New York Legislature in 1910. Recorded as the Executive Liability Act, the legislation made it possible for racetrack owners and members of its board of directors to be fined and imprisoned if anyone was found betting, even privately, anywhere on their premises. After a 1911 amendment to the law to limit the liability of owners and directors was defeated, every racetrack in New York State shut down. As a result, the Great Trial Stakes was not run in 1911 and 1912.

Owners, whose horses of racing age had nowhere to go, began sending them, their trainers and their jockeys to race in England and France. Many horses ended their racing careers there, and a number remained to become an important part of the European horse breeding industry. Thoroughbred Times reported that more than 1,500 American horses were sent overseas between 1908 and 1913, and of them at least 24 were either past, present, or future Champions. When a February 21, 1913 ruling by the New York Supreme Court, Appellate Division Court saw horse racing return in 1913, it was too late for the Sheepshead Bay horse racing facility, and it never reopened. However, the race was run for one final time at Belmont Park on June 30, 1913.

Great Trial Stakes winners who became the year's Champion Two-Year-Old:

 Blue Girl ( 1901)
 Colin (1907)
 Commando (1900)
 Dalmatian (1909)
 Domino (1893)
 Hamburg (1897)
 His Highness (1891)
 Irish Lad (1902)
 Jean Bereaud (1898)
 Sir Martin (1908)

Career Championships & honors of Great Trial Stakes winners:

Blue Girl:
 Co-Champion Two-Year-Old Female (1901)
 Champion Three-Year-Old Female (1902)

Colin:
 Champion Two-Year-Old Male (1907)
 Horse of the Year (1907, 1908)
 Champion Three-Year-Old Male (1908
 Racing Hall of Fame(1956)

Commando:
 Champion Two-Year-Old Male (1900)
 Horse of the Year (1900, 1901)
 Champion Three-Year-Old Male (1901)
 Leading sire in North America (1907)
 Racing Hall of Fame (1956)

Domino:
 Champion Two-Year-Old Colt (1893)
 Horse of the Year (1893)
 Racing Hall of Fame (1955)

Hamburg:
 Champion Two-Year-Old Colt (1897)
 Horse of the Year (1898)
 Racing Hall of Fame (1986)

Records
Speed record:
 1:12.00 – Sir Martin (1908) 6 F.
 1:10.20 – Winged Foot (1896)  5 ¾ F.

Most wins by a jockey:
 2 – Edward Garrison (1893, 1894)
 2 – Walter Miller (1906, 1907)

Most wins by a trainer:
 7 – John E. Madden (1897, 1899, 1901, 1902, 1903, 1904, 1908)

Most wins by an owner:
 6 – John E. Madden (1897, 1899, 1901, 1903, 1904, 1908)

Most wins by a breeder:
 7 – John E. Madden (1897, 1899, 1901, 1902, 1903, 1904, 1908)

Winners

References

Discontinued horse races in New York City
Flat horse races for two-year-olds
Sheepshead Bay Race Track
Belmont Park
Recurring sporting events established in 1891
Recurring sporting events disestablished in 1913
1891 establishments in New York (state)
1913 disestablishments in New York (state)